Mark Hutchings (born 25 May 1991) is an Australian rules footballer who last played for the West Coast Eagles in the Australian Football League (AFL) and currently plays for West Perth Football Club. A midfielder, he was delisted after a season at the club without having made his senior debut, and transferred to  upon his return to Western Australia. Establishing himself as a regular player for the team, Hutchings was one of the competition's best players during the 2012 season, playing state football, finishing second in the Sandover Medal, and winning West Perth's best and fairest award. He was drafted by West Coast at the 2012 National Draft, and made his senior AFL debut during the 2013 season, playing nine matches during his debut season, as well as playing in a premiership for West Perth.

Junior career
Hutchings graduated from Warwick Senior High School in Perth in 2008 and was part of the school's renowned Specialist Australian Rules Football Program. He played junior football for the Ballajura Junior Football Club and Coolbinia Junior Football Club's, and later represented Western Australia at the 2007 National Under-16 Championships. Zoned to the East Perth Football Club, where he played in the colts (under-18) and reserves divisions of the West Australian Football League (WAFL), Hutchings made his senior debut for East Perth in early August 2008, recording 21 disposals against  in what The West Australian described as a "spectacular debut". He went on to play in each of the club's five remaining matches, and the following season played in the club's first seven matches, before being named in Western Australia's team for the 2009 National Under-18 Championships. With future  player Mitch Duncan the only other East Perth player named in the state squad, Hutchings was named as captain of the team that went on to win the championships, and was best on ground in the game against the Northern Territory. Although he was not named in the under-18 All-Australian team, he was one of 75 (and 13 WA-based) players invited to the AFL draft camp, where he went on to finish equal third in the beep test, with a score of 14.12.

Senior career
Overlooked at the 2009 National Draft in November 2009, Hutchings was selected by the St Kilda Football Club with the 20th pick in the following month's Rookie Draft. However, he was de-listed by St Kilda at the end of the 2010 season, without playing a senior match for the club. He had spent most of the season playing for Sandringham Football Club, St Kilda's , playing twelve games and kicking three goals. Returning to Western Australia, Hutchings was recruited by the West Perth Football Club. He made his senior debut for the team in the second round of the 2011 season, and was outstanding early in the season—West Perth was undefeated in its first eight games, and Hutchings was the leader of The West Australian Footballer of the Year competition after nine rounds. He went on to be named in Western Australia's initial 31-man squad for the 2011 state game against Queensland, but did not make the final team after suffering a hamstring injury against Peel. Hutchings finished the season with 21 games for West Perth, and polled 21 votes to finish fourteenth in the Sandover Medal.

Following on from his form for West Perth, Hutchings nominated for the 2011 AFL Draft, but was again overlooked, despite having excelled at both WAFL- and AFL-run draft combines. Further good form during the 2012 season led to Hutchings' selection in the state team to play against South Australia, where he was the youngest player in the side. He played another 20 games for West Perth during the season, and was awarded the Breckler Medal as the club's best and fairest player. In the Sandover Medal, he polled 51 votes to finish second behind 's Kane Mitchell, the highest number of votes ever polled by a West Perth player. In the 2012 National Draft, Hutchings was selected by the West Coast Eagles with the 60th pick overall. Against , he recorded 16 tackles, which was both a club record and an overall season record, as well as the equal third-highest tackle count since the statistic was first recorded in 1987. At the conclusion of West Coast's AFL season Hutchings returned to West Perth to play in the WAFL Finals. West Perth went on to win the Grand Final by 49 points, and Hutchings was awarded the Simpson Medal for best afield with 29 disposals and 3 goals.

After his debut season Hutchings continued to be a regular part of the senior team, and was part of the 2015 Grand Final team that lost to Hawthorn. Over the course of his career, Hutchings was tasked with tagging roles more and more regularly, and by 2018 he was considered one of the best taggers in the competition. His most notable performance was in the 2018 Grand Final, when he kept Steele Sidebottom to 14 disposals after he had 41 disposals in the preliminary final the week prior, as well as having 15 disposals and kicking a goal himself. West Coast won the game by five points making Hutchings a premiership player. In Round 5 2019, Hutchings played his 100th game for West Coast.

Statistics

|- style="background:#EAEAEA"
| scope="row" text-align:center | 2013
| 
| 34 || 9 || 1 || 3 || 102 || 84 || 186 || 34 || 60 || 0.1 || 0.3 || 11.3 || 9.3 || 20.7 || 3.8 || 6.7 || 0
|-
| scope="row" text-align:center | 2014
| 
| 34 || 16 || 8 || 7 || 161 || 126 || 287 || 46 || 88 || 0.5 || 0.4 || 10.1 || 7.9 || 17.9 || 2.9 || 5.5 || 0
|- style="background:#EAEAEA"
| scope="row" text-align:center | 2015
| 
| 34 || 13 || 7 || 1 || 109 || 121 || 230 || 36 || 57 || 0.5 || 0.1 || 8.4 || 9.3 || 17.7 || 2.8 || 4.4 || 0
|-
| scope="row" text-align:center | 2016
| 
| 34 || 18 || 13 || 3 || 155 || 133 || 288 || 49 || 86 || 0.7 || 0.2 || 8.6 || 7.4 || 16.0 || 2.7 || 4.8 || 2
|- style="background:#EAEAEA"
| scope="row" text-align:center | 2017
| 
| 34 || 19 || 7 || 3 || 129 || 114 || 243 || 52 || 60 || 0.4 || 0.2 || 6.8 || 6.0 || 12.8 || 2.7 || 3.2 || 0
|-
| bgcolor=F0E68C |2018#
| 
| 34 || 20 || 9 || 5 || 212 || 130 || 342 || 69 || 87 || 0.5 || 0.3 || 10.6 || 6.5 || 17.1 || 3.5 || 4.4 || 0
|- style="background:#EAEAEA"
| scope="row" text-align:center | 2019
| 
| 34 || 10 || 1 || 3 || 81 || 46 || 127 || 28 || 32 || 0.1 || 0.3 || 8.1 || 4.6 || 12.7 || 2.8 || 3.2 || 0
|- style="background:#EAEAEA"
| scope="row" text-align:center | 2020
| 
| 34 || 3 || 0 || 0 || 15 || 9 || 24 || 35 || 4 || 0 || 0 || 5.0 || 3.0 || 8.0 || 1.67 || 1.33 || 0
|- style="background:#EAEAEA"
| scope="row" text-align:center | 2021
| 
| 34 || 4 || 0 || 0 || 23 || 15 || 38 || 9 || 8 || 0 || 0 || 5.75 || 3.75 || 9.5 || 2.25 || 2.0 || 0
|- style="background:#EAEAEA; font-weight:bold; width:2em"
| scope="row" text-align:center class="sortbottom" colspan=3 | Career
| 120
| 46
| 27
| 1036
| 817
| 1853
| 352
| 492
| 0.38
| 0.22
| 8.63
| 6.81
| 15.44
| 2.93
| 4.10
| 2
|}

Notes

See also
 List of West Coast Eagles players

References

External links

WAFL playing statistics

1991 births
East Perth Football Club players
Living people
Sandringham Football Club players
Australian rules footballers from Perth, Western Australia
West Coast Eagles players
West Coast Eagles Premiership players
West Perth Football Club players
West Coast Eagles (WAFL) players
One-time VFL/AFL Premiership players